Bluegrass Community and Technical College (BCTC) is a public community college in Lexington, Kentucky.  It is one of sixteen two-year, open admission colleges of the Kentucky Community and Technical College System (KCTCS). It was formed from the consolidation of two separate institutions: Lexington Community College and Central Kentucky Technical College. Lexington Community College was the last remaining college in the University of Kentucky Community College System until a vote by the trustees transferred governance to KCTCS in 2004. Prior to 1984, the college was named Lexington Technical Institute. Central Kentucky Technical College was part of the Workforce Development Cabinet of the Kentucky State Government until the creation of KCTCS in 1997. KCTCS was formed in 1997 by the state legislature through House Bill 1 which combined the technical colleges of the Workforce Development Cabinet and the community colleges previously with the University of Kentucky. BCTC is accredited by the Southern Association of Colleges and Schools (SACS). 

BCTC has a large international student base with students attending from Europe, Jordan, Turkey, and many other nations. As of Fall 2009, 11,500 students were enrolled at BCTC. As of 2019, tuition in-state is $182 (per credit hour) USD, Out-of-state $356 (per credit hour) USD (2019–20)

Service area
The primary service area of BCTC includes:

 Anderson County
 Boyle County
 Clark County
 Estill County
 Fayette County
 Franklin County
 Jessamine County
 Madison County
 Mercer County
 Powell County
 Scott County
 Woodford County

Campuses

BCTC consists of three main campus locations in Lexington, in addition to three other regional campuses outside its home city. It also maintains an Advanced Manufacturing Center, the North American Racing Academy, and various other educational sites.

Main campuses
Newtown Campus
Leestown Campus

Regional campuses
Danville/Boyle County Campus (Danville)
Lawrenceburg/Anderson County Campus (Lawrenceburg)
Winchester/Clark County Campus (Winchester)
Georgetown-Scott County Campus/Manufacturing Center (Georgetown)

Additional sites
Cooper Campus
Fayette County Adult Education - Newtown Campus North (Lexington)
North American Racing Academy (NARA) at the Thoroughbred Training Center (Lexington)

BCTC's Newtown Campus consists of two large buildings. One for general education subjects and the other geared towards science. The property once housed Eastern State Hospital.

BCTC's Leestown Campus consists of four buildings. Building C contains a variety of programs including Automotive Technology, Welding, Autobody, Cosmetology, a community day care center, Workforce Solutions, and Administrative offices. The Manufacturing Building includes programs in Electrical Technology, Engineering Technology, Industrial Maintenance Technology, Machine Tool, Computer Aided Drafting, and various classrooms, offices, and labs. Building A has the campus library and variety of classrooms and programs including Nursing and Adult Basic Education. Building B houses the Carpentry program and Shipping and Receiving.

BCTC Georgetown is located at the North American Production Support Center of Toyota on Cherry Blossom Drive. It focuses on Industrial Maintenance Technology and utilizes a unique combination of classroom space, open lab, and internships. The campus is a key partner in AMTEC, an NSF funded collaboration of community colleges and automotive manufacturers and suppliers focusing on technical education.
BCTC's Cooper Campus is located closest to the University of Kentucky campus, in the shadow of Kroger Field. The Cooper Campus consists of three buildings: the Academic Technical (AT), Oswald, and Moloney buildings. Oswald is the main building, consisting of a number of offices and classrooms, as well as the Bluegrass Cafe, the Learning Resource Center (Library) or LRC, and a Barnes & Noble College bookstore. The Academic Technical (AT) Building is primarily classrooms, and Moloney contains more classrooms, as well as several computer labs and department offices.

BCTC has a robust online education program, offering a wide variety of general education courses and technical courses.  The online course tuition is an affordable flat-rate for in-state and out-of-state students alike. Online students come from all over the world.

References

External links

 Official website

Two-year colleges in the United States
Universities and colleges in Lexington, Kentucky
Educational institutions established in 2005
Universities and colleges accredited by the Southern Association of Colleges and Schools
Buildings and structures in Lexington, Kentucky
Education in Boyle County, Kentucky
Education in Scott County, Kentucky
Education in Anderson County, Kentucky
Education in Clark County, Kentucky
Buildings and structures in Danville, Kentucky
Buildings and structures in Clark County, Kentucky
Buildings and structures in Anderson County, Kentucky
Kentucky Community and Technical College System
2005 establishments in Kentucky